Hazuki Watanabe (渡部 葉月, born 7 August 2004) is a Japanese artistic gymnast. She is the 2022 World Champion on the balance beam. She was part of the bronze medal winning team at the 2022 Asian Championships.  Additionally she represented Japan at the inaugural Junior World Championships.

Early life 
Watanabe was born in Mie, Japan in 2004.

Career

2019 
Watanabe competed at the 2019 City of Jesolo Trophy where she helped Japan finish fifth as a team.  She was later selected to compete at the inaugural Junior World Championships alongside Shoko Miyata and Chiaki Hatakeda; they finished eleventh as a team.

2022 
Watanabe competed at the Asian Championships where she helped Japan finish third as a team.  Later in the year Watanabe was selected to represent Japan at the 2022 World Championships alongside Shoko Miyata, Kokoro Fukasawa, Ayaka Sakaguchi, Chiharu Yamada, and Arisa Kasahara; she was initially the alternate.  However Kasahara later withdrew from the team due to injury and Watanabe was added to the main team.  While at the World Championships Watanabe helped Japan finish seventh as a team and individually she qualified to the balance beam final.  During the balance beam final Watanabe won gold, becoming the third Japanese gymnast to win the World title on balance beam after Keiko Tanaka-Ikeda and Urara Ashikawa.

Competitive history

References 

2004 births
Living people
Japanese female artistic gymnasts
21st-century Japanese women
World champion gymnasts
Medalists at the World Artistic Gymnastics Championships